Abarabashi (also Romanized as Ābārābāshī) is a village in Chaldoran-e Shomali Rural District, in the Central District of Chaldoran County, West Azerbaijan Province, Iran. In the 2006 census, its population was 85, in 16 families.

References 

Tageo

Populated places in Chaldoran County